State Route 76 (SR-76) is a state highway in the U.S. state of Utah that serves as a connector from I-70 to SR-72 at Fremont Junction. This road was given the SR-76 designation in 1977, coinciding with the construction of I-70 through the area. Previously the route was a portion of State Route 10, which prior to truncation extended to Salina.

Route description
The route begins at the northern end of the diamond interchange with exit 86 and briefly heads south before turning east on a frontage road paralleling I-70's southern side. Just past this turn is a rest area, constructed for motorists traveling on I-70. The route continues to hug the freeway's southern side for  until intersecting with SR-72, where it terminates.

History
This route was originally part of State Route 10, which at the time had a southern terminus in Salina. When I-70 was under construction, route 10 was truncated to remove the portion that would be replaced by I-70. What is now numbered State Route 76 was formed in 1977, keeping this portion of the old highway under state maintenance, with the intent to connect I-70 to SR-72 while providing a rest area to motorists along the way.

Major intersections

References

076
 076